The University Athletic Association of the Philippines Season 73 basketball tournaments are the basketball events of UAAP's 2010-11 season. The basketball season began on July 10, 2010 at the Araneta Coliseum in Quezon City with an opening ceremony hosted by De La Salle University, followed by a couple of men's basketball games. Hosts De La Salle Green Archers defeated the UP Fighting Maroons, and the UST Growling Tigers defeated the UE Red Warriors in the last game of the day.

Ato Badolato, former head coach of the San Beda Red Cubs, was named commissioner for basketball for the 2010 season.

Results

Juniors
The Juniors were the first of the three basketball tournaments to be finished. The Ateneo Blue Eaglets forced the step ladder format, putting themselves directly into the finals. Four other teams battled it out for the one spot left in the finals, with UST triumphing after beating out La Salle, 74–60. Since Ateneo cleared the eliminations, they were given an automatic 1–0 lead in the finals series. However, UST tied it up with a 77–71 win. Ateneo then continued on to sweep the next two games, 76–66 in game 2, and 76–59 in game 3. This was the Juniors' 17th title, and 3rd consecutive championship.

Women
Second-seed Adamson Lady Falcons has advanced to the finals with a win over the UST Lady Tigresses, 72–59. However, fourth-seed La Salle Lady Archers edged out first-seed FEU Lady Tamaraws to extend the series, where the winner will advance and face Adamson. FEU won the knockout match to set up a finals showdown with Adamson.

Men
First-seed FEU Tamaraws advanced to the finals after beating the De La Salle Green Archers in overtime, 69–59. They faced off against the defending champion Ateneo Blue Eagles, who blew past the Adamson Falcons, 68–55. Ateneo started off with an outstanding win, sweeping the Tamaraws by 23 points in game one (72–49), which was the lowest output by a team in the finals since UAAP Season 61, by the same school. The Tamaraws looked ahead for a comeback, being only down by one point, 56–57, in the last 3 minutes of the 4th quarter. However. the Blue Eagles managed to distance, with 2 successive baskets, and a good free throw. FEU scored 3 successful free throws to go up 59–61 against the Ateneans, at the final minute of the championship. However, with a critical hold by Ateneo, Ryan Buenafe pulled off a three-point shot to give Ateneo a 64–59 lead while heading into the final 20 seconds of the game. FEU managed to score just one more three-pointer, but still went down, 62–65. The Ateneo Blue Eagles became the fifth successful team to achieve 3 consecutive championships, and capture their 6th championship title.

Finals MVP
In Game 2, Ryan Buenafe delivered a season high of 23 points, and a critical three-point shot that lead to the championship. He was named Finals MVP.

Men's tournament

Teams

Elimination round
Most games were held at the Araneta Coliseum in Quezon City and the PhilSports Arena in Pasig, with a single gameday played at Filoil Flying V Arena in San Juan.

Team standings

Match-up results

Bracket

Semifinals

FEU vs. La Salle series

Ateneo vs. Adamson series

Finals

Finals Most Valuable Player:

Awards 

Most Valuable Player: 
Rookie of the Year:

Women's tournament

Elimination round

Team standings

Match-up results

Bracket

Semifinals

FEU vs. La Salle

Adamson vs. UST

Finals

Finals Most Valuable Player:

Awards

Most Valuable Player: 
Rookie of the Year:

Juniors' tournament

Elimination round

Team standings

Match-up results

Fourth–seed playoff

Second–seed playoff

Bracket

Stepladder semifinals

First round
This is a single-elimination game.

Second round
UST has the twice-to-beat advantage, where they only have to win once, while their opponents twice, to progress.

Finals
Ateneo has to win two times, while their opponent has to win three times.

Finals Most Valuable Player:

Awards

Most Valuable Player: 
Rookie of the Year:

See also
NCAA Season 86 basketball tournaments

References

73
2010–11 in Philippine college basketball
Basket